Ellescini is a tribe of true weevils in the family of beetles known as Curculionidae. There are at least 3 genera and about 18 described species in Ellescini.

Genera
These three genera belong to the tribe Ellescini:
 Dorytomus Germar, 1817 i c g b
 Ellescus Dejean, 1821 i c g b
 Proctorus LeConte, 1876 i c g b
Data sources: i = ITIS, c = Catalogue of Life, g = GBIF, b = Bugguide.net

References

Further reading

External links

 

Curculioninae